Gordon Gray may refer to:
 Gordon Gray (cardinal) (1910–1993), Scottish Cardinal Archbishop of St Andrews and Edinburgh
 Gordon Gray (politician) (1909–1982), official in the government of the United States during the administrations of Harry Truman and Dwight Eisenhower
 Gordon Gray (rugby) (1909-1975), Scottish rugby union and rugby league player
 Gordon Gray III (born 1956), U.S. ambassador
 Gordon-Gray, the author abbreviation for Kathleen Dixon Huntley Gordon-Gray (1918-2012)